Río Santiago is a short river of Puerto Rico. It discharges into the Caribbean Sea from Naguabo.

See also

 List of rivers of Puerto Rico

References

External links
 USGS Hydrologic Unit Map – Caribbean Region (1974)

Rivers of Puerto Rico